Jon Rogers may refer to:

Jon Rogers (musician), see Bad Channels
Jon Rogers (basketball), see Southeast Texas Mavericks

See also
Jonathan Rogers (disambiguation)
John Rogers (disambiguation)